Pandit Prithi Nath College (PPN College) is an educational institution in Kanpur, in Uttar Pradesh state in India. It is affiliated with Chhatrapati Shahu Ji Maharaj University (CSJM University), Kanpur.

Location
It is located on Mall Road (Mahatma Gandhi Marg) between Parade Market and Lal Imli Mills in the heart of Kanpur.

Affiliation 
Agra University - July 1959
Kanpur University (At Present CSJM University Kanpur) - 1966–Present

Notable alumni
 Rajeev Shukla, Chairman, Indian Premier League (IPL)
 Naresh Uttam, State President, Uttar Pradesh, Samajwadi Party
 Sone Lal Patel, Founder, Apna Dal
 Amitabh Bajpai, MLA

Faculties and courses
Arts - (BA,MA)
Science - (Bsc,Msc)
Commerce - (Bcom,Mcom)
Business Administration (BBA)
Computer & IT (BCA)

Infrastructure & Fest
The college organises a Youth Festival each year, which comprises various activities including photography, debate, singing and dancing.

Amenities
The college has a newly opened auditorium with a total capacity of 150+ students. There is a newly opened "e-library containing thousands of books for all the courses (BA, Bsc, Bcom, etc.) and an offline library for extensive reading and issue of books. There are laboratories of various types: physics, chemistry, biology and computers.

References

 http://ppncollege.org/
 https://minextlive.jagran.com/admission-in-ppn-college-will-get-those-students-who-get-more-than-90-percent-marks-213480

Colleges in India
Universities and colleges in Kanpur
Colleges affiliated to Chhatrapati Shahu Ji Maharaj University
Educational institutions established in 1959
1959 establishments in Uttar Pradesh